Robert "Bob" Greenblatt (May 14, 1938 – October 21, 2009) is best known as an early opponent of America's military involvement in Vietnam and was the founding co-chairman and national coordinator of The National Mobilization Committee to End the War in Vietnam. He is the first cousin, once removed, of Trump advisor Jason Greenblatt and Canadian religious leader and Holocaust educator Eli Rubenstein.

Early life
Greenblatt was born in Debrecen, Hungary, and was a prisoner in Nazi concentration camps in Germany and Austria until his release with the end of the war. He moved to the United States with his parents Julius and Pessie in 1949.

Education
He studied at Yeshiva Chaim Berlin, then attended Brooklyn College, then Yale, where he received his PhD in mathematics in 1963, at the age of 25, under American mathematician William Schumacher Massey (a remarkable feat for a child Holocaust survivor who immigrated to the U.S. after the war at 11 years of age, considering the average PhD is achieved at 33 years of age.)

Activism

Greenblatt became an assistant professor of mathematics at Cornell University where he met Bruce Dancis, the first student to tear up his draft card and send it back to the draft board. In 1966, Greenblatt became very involved in the anti war movement and organized a series of teach-ins in order to "educate Americans about the tragic errors of our Vietnam policies." He was also vice president of their sponsoring organization, the Inter-University Committee for Debate on Foreign Policy. A large part of his focus was encouraging all white college students to drop-out of school so as not to be a part of draft deferments which discriminate against African Americans who are too poor to get a higher education. He left his post at the university to devote himself full time to the cause. He said "I am a former professor of mathematics, that was before I became a drop-out." He instructed white students saying, "Take a few courses, but not enough to qualify as a full-time student and be deferred. You have better things to do."

In June 1966, Greenblatt was ordered to jail for his activities but was released soon after. He was one of the chief organizers of the Spring Mobilization to End the War in Vietnam, scheduled for both New York City and San Francisco on April 15, 1967. Organizers had expected only 150,000 but estimates showed between 300,000 and 400,000 attended. On October 21, Greenblatt was an organizer of a march on The Pentagon. It was purposely arranged for a weekend because "We checked that out and found that 25,000 people work in the Pentagon during the week. But most of these are secretarial and clerical personnel. The 7,000 who work on week-ends are the people we want to reach. They are the decision-making military men, and for them, war-making is a 24-hour-a-day, 7-day-a-week occupation."

In 1968, Greenblatt and another academic went to Hanoi with another academic and author Susan Sontag. She wrote a journal of the trip for Esquire Magazine.

House Un-American Activities Committee

In 1969 Greenblatt was subpoenaed by The House Un-American Activities Committee, who seized a large quantity of documents and forced him to testify. Charges were eventually dropped "but not before HUAC's autumnal carnival" in the words of the Village Voice.

Greenblatt's cross examination was led by Richard Howard Ichord Jr., last chairman of the House Un-American Activities Committee. Greenblatt was defended by prominent civil rights lawyer Sanford M. Katz.

Greenblatt was quite combative with the committee, arguing that their actions were reminiscent of the fascist tendencies he had escaped from in Nazi occupied Europe.

"I will tell you when I came to this country. After spending several years in ghettos, in repressive institutions in Hungary and Germany ... I spent several years in ghettos in Hungary. I spent years in concentration camps in Germany under the most blatant kind of Fascist rule — which again, and at that time, was justified, in the name of protecting the security of the countries then involved. It was at that time justified as a way of separating out the people that were endangering the security of that country, and I may remind the Chair that ultimately the people who were so described were exterminated."

"I came to the United States when I had had enough of that kind of fascism and thought I could meet with a different kind of condition in this country. ... The country is the country of Hungary, at a time when fascism was rising in Hungary and at a time when this kind of intimidation was at approximately the same stage as it seems to be in the events surrounding these hearings."

......there are many millions of people in this country who are opposed to this Government policy, that this country not be labeled in the eyes of all the world as simply a repetition of other countries, the names of which, when I mentioned them the other day, for some reason the chairman became very concerned about, that there is not hopefully a repetition of Germany of the 1940s and not simply a repetition of Hungary in the 1930's and 1940s's, which is still possible in this country, and with the people in this country who will fight this kind of genocidal war in Vietnam".

He also expressed concern for his own physical safety and that of fellow activists, including Abbie Hoffman, who was arrested entering the House of Representatives after being subpoenaed, even refusing to testify until he could be assured of Hoffman's well-being.

Mr. Greenblatt: "Mr. Chairman ... I want to make it absolutely clear that I came to Washington, I came to these committee hearings, despite reservations and the very strong feeling that I have about them, as I indicated earlier, with the full intention of testifying and responding to any questions that may be put to me about my own actions, about my own activities, although I do feel and feel very strongly that I am not legally, morally, and constitutionally under an obligation to do so for reasons that have been cited by counsel and that I have tried to cite myself. I am still willing, perfectly willing, to go forward with this attempt to testify, although I will not be willing to testify about actions and activities of other people. I will be willing to testify about my own actions and my own activities because I am proud of them. However, as I tried to indicate earlier, I am very concerned about the general atmosphere in which these hearings are being conducted, both inside and outside this hearing room. I am very concerned about the kind of actions that the committee and law enforcement officers, or people who should be enforcing the law, have taken against myself, attorneys, other witnesses, colleagues of mine that have appeared or tried to appear before this committee…….. And I must say at this time, specifically, that the greatest outrage was reached in the last few days when, in fact, one of my colleagues, one of my brothers, was physically assaulted outside this committee. Until I know the whereabouts and the well-being (Cut off by Chairman…) 
It is difficult for me to answer the question when one of these seven people who have been subpoenaed to this hearing was arrested for trying to walk into the hearing room and trying to walk into the building in which this hearing room is located. I find it very difficult, indeed, to be responsive under those kinds of circumstances of intimidation and of use of force. 
 
Mr. Ichord. And you are going to refuse to answer on those grounds?

Mr. Greenblatt. I am unwilling to testify until I know that these kinds of tactics will no longer be employed, until I have some kind of assurance as to the well-being of Mr. Hoffman.

Later life

In later life, Robert became the president of the Brooklyn chapter of Hillel: The Foundation for Jewish Campus Life.

One of his children, Brooklyn artist Jeremiah Grunblatt, died in a car crash on his honeymoon in October 2015, three days after his wedding.

Quotes

"We are surrounded by the explosions of discontent and fear, resulting from long-term exploitation and neglect. The myths of the past, used to camouflage oppressive racial and class structures, are disintegrating faster than new ones can be erected in their place. Political nostrums, social science jargon and rehashed ideological rhetoric about equality and opportunity continue to be hawked on the television street corner of America, but they seem only vaguely related to the events around us. Unreal leaders in electronic boxes appear before us as little gray mannequins, speaking into the wind words that they have not written to people they cannot see about problems they do not know."

"The myths changed and grew ever more grandiose with each new need for rationalization. The frontier spirit and self-reliance, manifest destiny, laissez faire, free enterprise and the great melting pot: these are the tombstones of a people enslaved, another exterminated and the waves of immigrants neglected, exploited and digested. But some of the victims refuse to die. And as they begin to stir, shaking the foundations of a society built upon their premature graves, we find the cracks and fissures everywhere, breaking through the plaster of egalitarian myths, exposing the truly stabilizing factors: the interdependence of parasitic relationships, the vested interests of the middle class and the coercive power of the state controlled by a corporate ruling elite. Societies and men have ever been mesmerized by such exploitive myths, not only because of their charismatic force but because of the primacy of man's social character."

"But the myths of the melting pot, America's plastic substitute for the rich experience of peoplehood, have been destroyed beyond salvage by the recent movement of Black and Third World people, to whom this cooptative and castrating elixir was never made available, for they were not merely outcasts, but to be regarded as a different species. Those non-white peoples, whom history exempted from this trap by never making it available, are now being cajoled and coerced into it through the co-optative mechanisms of such programs as Black capitalism and repressive culture nationalism. And, as in every previous case, the efficacy of this approach rests on successful recruitment of ethnic collaborators willing to help transform the peculiar cultural and normative energies of the group into enslaving and alienating functions. Indeed, the share of relative affluence and apparent autonomy permitted to any group in America tends to be in direct proportion to the extent to which it has succeeded in internalizing these repressive functions. The pitifully small minority who escaped, largely by their own efforts, and adopted inter-ethnic and international perspectives, are hounded as anarchists or foreign agents by the state and as traitors by the various ethnic mafiosi."

"The injunction from Ethics of the Fathers to 'make a fence around the Torah' and to guard and preserve ethical and social precepts has been bartered away in substance in our opportunistic desire to "become like the other nations of the world." We have traded it for the maxim of Robert Frost's thoughtless and superstitious farmer: Good fences make good neighbors. We erect and maintain institutions which separate us from our neighbors and destroy the values the fences are supposed to preserve."

"The tradition of Abraham at Sodom and Gomorrah established the obligation to struggle on behalf of all people, even if it means challenging the highest authority. Jonah was reprimanded and punished for refusing to preach to Nineveh, not Jerusalem."

"The demands placed on us are as ancient as our history: Na'aseh V' nishmah. A statement not of blind faith but of uncompromising dedication and idealism: we will do what is right and take whatever the consequences. We must take full part in the coming and necessary American revolution as followers and leaders, as communities and individuals. We must do this on the side of the oppressed because it is right and it, too, is our heritage. We must reorient our relation to the past, cease using it as justification of the inequities of the present and the method for predetermining and freezing the future. Rather, the past must provide roots for the present and strength to change the future."

"I am a Jew, an American, a Revolutionary. I am all three at once because each flows out of and merges into one life history. I continue to be each one by choice and self-definition, as well as external, but in no case universal judgment. Establishment of my claim to each of these honorifics was accompanied by hardship and fulfillment, in the ghettos and camps of Europe, as an immigrant in America and in the streets and jails and under the nightsticks of this "golden land." I seek neither dialogue nor accommodation with the soured and hate-filled scraps of humanity who deny my claim to be a Jew, an American, a Revolutionary unless I denounce all but one. But to those sisters and brothers who honestly question the compatibility of these categories, I declare my belief that the synthesis is a necessary pre-condition and must therefore be a part of our revolutionary vision."

References

People from Debrecen
American people of Hungarian-Jewish descent
Cornell University faculty
Brooklyn College alumni
1938 births
2009 deaths